Babar Ali (born 30 June 1972) is a Pakistani film and television actor. He started his career at age sixteen. Babar Ali is known for playing ‘Bali’ in the drama serial Landa Bazaar directed by Khalil-ur-Rehman Qamar.

Career
Babar Ali's first film appearance was in Jeeva (1995 film), directed by Syed Noor. He went on to appear in other films such as Munda Bigra Jaye (1995), Chor Machaye Shor (1996), Khoey Ho Tum Kahan (2001), Yeh Dil Aap Ka Huwa (2002) and Larki Punjaban (2003). He starred as Bali, the lead character in the 2002 PTV television drama series Landa Bazar.

In 2017, Babar revived his character of Bali (Iqbal) in Laal Ishq, which was a sequel to the original 2002 drama series.

In 2022, he  appeared in The Legend of Maula Jatt.

Filmography

Television

As an actor

TV show host
Morning with Babar Ali (Apna Channel)

Awards
 Nigar Award for Best Male Singer in film Mehndi Waley Hath (2000).

See also 
 List of Lollywood actors

References

External links
 
Profile of Babar Ali on YouTube

Living people
Nigar Award winners
Pakistani male film actors
Pakistani male television actors
People from Karachi
Punjabi people
1972 births